This a list of notable English landscape gardens.

United Kingdom 

 Attingham Park, Shropshire
 Berrington Hall, Herefordshire
 Blenheim Palace, Oxfordshire
 Bowood House, Wiltshire
 Buckingham Palace Garden, London
 Castle Howard, Yorkshire
 Chatsworth House, Derbyshire
 Chiswick House, London
 Claremont Landscape Garden, Surrey
 Cliveden, Buckinghamshire
 Croome Park, Worcestershire
 Gibside, County Durham
 Hafod Uchtryd, Ceredigion
 Hagley Hall, Worcestershire
 Harcourt Arboretum, Oxfordshire
 Hawkstone Park, Shropshire
 Heaton Park, Manchester
 Hestercombe House, Somerset
 Highclere Castle, Hampshire
 Holkham Hall, Norfolk
 Kedleston Hall, Derbyshire
 Kew Gardens, London
 The Leasowes, Shropshire
 Margam Country Park, Neath
 Middleton Hall (National Botanic Garden of Wales), Carmarthenshire
 Newton Park, Cornwall
 Nostell Priory, Yorkshire
 Painshill Park, Surrey
 Petworth House, West Sussex
 Piercefield House, Monmouthshire
 Prior Park Landscape Garden, Bath
 Rousham House, Oxfordshire
 Sheffield Park, East Sussex
 Sheringham Park, Norfolk
 Shugborough Hall, Staffordshire
 Stackpole Estate, Pembrokeshire
 Stourhead, Wiltshire
 Studley Royal, Yorkshire
 Stowe Gardens, Buckinghamshire
 Tatton Park, Cheshire
 Trentham Gardens, Staffordshire
 Virginia Water Lake, Windsor Great Park, Surrey
 Wentworth Castle, Yorkshire
 Wentworth Woodhouse, Yorkshire
 West Wycombe Park, Buckinghamshire
 Wilton House, Wiltshire
 Wimpole Hall, Cambridgeshire
 Wrest Park, Bedfordshire

Austria
 The palace gardens of Schloss Eggenberg (Graz)

Belgium 

 Royal Garden, Royal Castle of Laeken.
 Castle gardens of Hof ter Saksen, Beveren-Waas
  in Ghent
 The Nationale Plantentuin of Belgium

Denmark 
 Liselund on the Island of Møn

France 
 see French landscape garden

Germany 

 Englischer Garten ("English Garden") in Munich, Germany
 English Grounds of Wörlitz, Wörlitz
 Park von Muskau (now partly in Poland)
 Wilhelmshöhe, Kassel
 Nymphenburg, Munich (formal garden transformed to landscape garden)
 Schwetzingen Garden, Schwetzingen (combined formal / landscape garden)
 Park Schönbusch or "Bois-Jolie", Aschaffenburg
 Branitzer Park, Cottbus
 Jenischpark in Hamburg
 Park Glienicke, Berlin-Wannsee
 Nerotalanlagen in Wiesbaden

Hungary

 Margitsziget, Budapest
 Mikosdpuszta
 Városliget, Budapest

Italy 

 Boboli Gardens, Firenze
 Villa Borghese gardens, Rome
 Villa Doria Pamphili, Rome
 Villa d'Este, Tivoli
 Giardino all'inglese at Royal Palace of Caserta

The Netherlands 
 The garden of 
 in Utrecht
Sarphatipark in Amsterdam
Vondelpark in Amsterdam

Poland 
 Saxon Garden, Warsaw

Russia 

 Pavlovsk Park
 Alexander Park in Tsarskoe Selo
 Mon Repos, Vyborg

Spain 
 Los jardines del Buen Retiro, Madrid
 Parque de El Capricho, Madrid
 Jardín del Príncipe at Real Sitio de Aranjuez, Aranjuez

Sweden 
Drottningholm Palace, Lovön
Bellevue, Stockholm
Haga Park, Solna

Ukraine 
 Sofiyivka Park, Uman

United States
Biltmore Estate
Edsel and Eleanor Ford House

+
Landscape gardens